Michael Allen Madden (born May 13, 1979) is an American musician and a former bassist for the pop rock band Maroon 5.

Life and music career 
Madden was born in Austin, Texas. He began playing in junior high school at the Brentwood School in Los Angeles, playing in garages along with friends Jesse Carmichael (guitar/vocals) and Adam Levine (vocals/guitar). The bands Pearl Jam and Nirvana were among their influences. In 1994, with the addition of Ryan Dusick (drums), the band Kara's Flowers was formed.

After the break-up of Kara's Flowers, Madden attended classes at UCLA. After Madden attended college, the group reformed with guitarist James Valentine joining the line-up, and Jesse Carmichael mainly playing the keyboards, and pursued a new musical direction, changing their name to Maroon 5. Throughout their career, the band has released six studio albums: Songs About Jane (2002), It Won't Be Soon Before Long (2007), Hands All Over (2010), Overexposed (2012), V (2014) and Red Pill Blues (2017).

Until his departure from Maroon 5 on July 14, 2020, Madden was the only other member besides Adam Levine to have remained in both Kara's Flowers and Maroon 5 consistently.

Madden is also a founding member of a multimedia project called Collapsing Scenery, along with multi-instrumentalist Don Devore. In that project, Madden used the alias "Reggie Debris."

Personal life 
Madden was a dedicated vegan for ten years, and he supported the farmers and Farm Sanctuary.

Legal issues 
In 2016, Madden was arrested on drug possession charges alongside James Gubelmann, Ivanka Trump's ex-boyfriend, outside a bar in Manhattan. Madden accepted a day of community service in a plea deal.

On June 27, 2020, he was arrested on domestic violence charges. He announced his leave of absence from Maroon 5 following his arrest. The Los Angeles District Attorney ultimately declined prosecution; the case was dropped, and no charges were filed.

Discography

As a featured artist

As a producer 
 VietNam – VietNam (2007)
 The Icarus Line – Wildlife (2011)
 Giant Drag – Waking Up Is Hard to Do (2013)

Other albums, on which Madden has played
 Jenny Lewis with The Watson Twins – Rabbit Fur Coat (2006)
 The Tyde – Three's Co. (2006)
 VietNam – VietNam (2007)
 Rilo Kiley – Under the Blacklight (2007)
 Jenny Lewis – The Voyager (2014)
 Various Artists – Song One: Original Motion Picture Soundtrack (2015)

References

External links 
Maroon 5 official website
Mickey in Bass Player Magazine (online edition)

1979 births
Living people
Maroon 5 members
21st-century American bass guitarists